Jelena Đurovic (also transliterated as Djurović;; born 13 July 1973) is a Montenegrin journalist, writer and political activist of a Jewish-Montenegrin origin based in Belgrade, Serbia. Jelena was a founder and Vice President of the Jewish Community of Montenegro. Currently, she is a Chairwoman of OJC SEE and member of the Board of the Montenegrin national council in Belgrade, Serbia. As a journalist, she works as film and TV critic.

Literary work
Jelena is a graduate of the Faculty of Dramatic Arts in Belgrade, Department of Theater and radio production. Her bachelor thesis, "Theatre in the shadow of the gallows" ("Pozornica u senci vešala") explored the programming policies of Belgrade theaters during the Slobodan Milošević era. During the NATO bombing of Yugoslavia in 1999, Jelena lived in Budapest, Hungary, where she started work on her novel "Kingdom" published in November 2003, excerpts from which were published in the book Voices from the faultline, A Balkan Anthology.

Kingdom
"Kingdom" is the book that elaborates influence of historical events in the life of an individual. It plays with three sequences – literary genres and uses a fragmentary approach, but the basic idea, well hidden among its pages, is the understanding of the art.

The choice of the nine most significant dates in Yugoslav history, the plot of the story that unfolds amongst these dates, as well as the genres of each of the chapters in "Kingdom" form a unique literary experiment.

30 February

In October 2011. her second novel, "February 30th" ("30. februar") was published in Belgrade. It is a sci-fi love story that treats Serbian current affairs from the viewpoint of 4 main characters, young professionals living in Belgrade. Each of them is giving their own view of the same set of events that, eventually, lead to exposure of corruption and dishonesty of Serbian political and business elites. At the same time this novel gives the grim picture of the hopelessness that Serbian young adults have to deal with.

Journalism
In 1994 and 1995 she worked at one of Belgrade's most popular radio stations, Studio B, as author and editor of the weekly radio show "Time In". This show was sponsored by Soros Fund Yugoslavia. Since October 2005 she is the author and editor of "AgitPop" blog. Its motto is a citation from the letter written by Sigmund Freud to Albert Einstein in Vienna in September 1932: "Meanwhile we may rest on the assurance that whatever makes for cultural development is working also against war...". At the same time Jelena writes for several Serbian newspapers and magazines and became a part of the editorial team of the first internet radio station in Serbia, "Novi Radio Beograd".

Since January 2011 Jelena is founder and editor in chief of a regional web portal Agitpop.me.

Since March 2013 radio show Agitpop is being broadcast on the Serbian national radio station B92.

Personal life
Đurović was born in Belgrade, Yugoslavia, to a Montenegrin father and a mother of Jewish descent. Her great-grandmother Serafina was related to Lotika Zellermeier, who was the inspiration for a character in Ivo Andrić's novel The Bridge on the Drina.

References

External links
Interview with Jelena Đurović (in Serbian) related to her latest novel "February 30th" 
Interview with Jelena Đurović (in Serbian) for Belgrade daily newspaper Glas
Jelena on BalkanWriters.com 
"Kraljevstvo" on WorldCat.org
Slavic and Eastern European Collections at UC Berkeley, New Acquisitions from and about Eastern Europe (except Poland), page 53

Serbian women writers
Serbian Jews
Jewish bloggers
1973 births
Living people
Writers from Belgrade
Serbian people of Montenegrin descent
University of Arts in Belgrade alumni
Serbian bloggers
Serbian women bloggers
Montenegrin Jews
21st-century women writers